Marvin Hayes (born May 13, 1986) is a Filipino professional basketball player who last played for the Sarangani Marlins of the Maharlika Pilipinas Basketball League (MPBL). He was selected as the 21st overall pick in the 2010 PBA draft by Alaska.

On September 4, 2013, he was involved in a brawl in a game against San Mig Coffee Mixers. The scuffle ensued after he and San Mig import Marqus Blakely got tangled up. Blakely’s teammate Joe Devance shoved him down on the floor, then his teammate Kelly Nabong pushed Blakely. He and Devance were slapped with a technical foul for second motion. He was also ordered to pay P20,000 fine for his “unsportsmanlike conduct, equivalent to a flagrant foul penalty two”.

On May 11, 2015, Hayes was signed up by the GlobalPort Batang Pier as a 14th local player.

PBA career statistics

Correct as of July 18, 2016

Regular season

|-
| align="left" | 
| align="left" | GlobalPort
| 6 || 16.5 || .444 || .000 || .636 || 3.3 || 1.0 || .3 || .2 || 3.8
|-
| align="left" | 
| align="left" | GlobalPort
| 23 || 14.6 || .434 || .000 || .609 || 2.5 || .7 || .2 || .3 || 3.5
|-
| align="left" | 
| align="left" | GlobalPort
| 8 || 6.9 || .400 || .000 || .000 || 1.4 || .0 || .0 || .1 || 1.0
|-
| align="left" | 
| align="left" | GlobalPort / Phoenix
| 7 || 4.1 || 1.000 || .000 || .750 || .3 || .1 || .0 || .0 || 1.6
|-class=sortbottom
| align=center colspan=2 | Career
| 44 || 11.8 || .454 || .000 || .615 || 2.1 || .5 || .1 || .2 || 2.8

References

1986 births
Living people
Alaska Aces (PBA) players
Filipino men's basketball players
NorthPort Batang Pier players
JRU Heavy Bombers basketball players
Phoenix Super LPG Fuel Masters players
Shooting guards
Small forwards
Basketball players from Quezon City
Maharlika Pilipinas Basketball League players
Alaska Aces (PBA) draft picks
Filipino men's 3x3 basketball players
PBA 3x3 players
Southeast Asian Games bronze medalists for the Philippines
Competitors at the 2021 Southeast Asian Games
Southeast Asian Games medalists in 3x3 basketball